Nathaniel Griffith Lerotholi  (1870 – 23 June 1939) was the paramount chief of Basutoland from 11 April 1913 when he succeeded his brother Letsie II until his death in 1939. He was succeeded by his son Simon Seeiso Griffith.

References 

1870 births
1939 deaths
House of Moshesh
Commanders of the Order of the British Empire
Basutoland people